Manuel Francisco Salvador (born 1 February 1957), known as Cavungi, is a Portuguese retired footballer who played as a left winger.

Career
Born in Luanda, Cavungi is a youth product from S.L. Benfica. In 1975–76, with Mário Wilson as manager, he made his professional debut on 11 April 1976, against CUF. In the next seasons, the best he could do, was starting 9 league games in 1977–78, with 2 goals. In 1980–81, he was loaned to S.C. Braga, making ten starts in twenty appearances. 

Released in 1982–83, he joined G.C. Alcobaça, in the team debut season in the Primeira Divisão, ending in relegation. From then on, he played only in the lower divisions.

International career
Cavungi represented his nation at under-18 level in the Tournoi Juniors de Cannes, and the qualification for the 1975 UEFA European Under-18 Championship.

Honours
Benfica
Primeira Liga: 1975–76, 1976–77
Taça de Portugal: 1979–80

References

External links

1957 births
Living people
Footballers from Luanda
Portuguese footballers
Association football wingers
Primeira Liga players
Liga Portugal 2 players
S.L. Benfica footballers
S.C. Braga players
G.C. Alcobaça players
Leixões S.C. players
C.D. Cova da Piedade players
Portugal youth international footballers